Marco Novaro (8 August 1912 – 29 November 1993) was an Italian sailor who competed in the 1960 Summer Olympics.

References

External links
 

1912 births
1993 deaths
Italian male sailors (sport)
Olympic sailors of Italy
Sailors at the 1960 Summer Olympics – 5.5 Metre